Rho Tucanae (ρ Tuc, ρ Tucanae) is a binary star system in the southern constellation of Tucana. It is visible to the naked eye with a combined apparent visual magnitude of +5.38. Based upon an annual parallax shift of 24.37 mas as seen from Earth, it is located 131 light years from the Sun.

This is a single-lined spectroscopic binary with a close, nearly circular orbit having a period of 4.82 days and an eccentricity of 0.02. The primary member, component A, is a yellow-white hued F-type main sequence star with a stellar classification of F6 V. It is around 2.6 billion years old and a member of the thin disk population. The primary has about 1.66 times the mass of the Sun while the secondary is just 0.33 times the Sun's mass.

References

F-type main-sequence stars
Spectroscopic binaries
Tucanae, Rho
Tucana (constellation)
Durchmusterung objects
003330
004089
0187